The 2019 Delta State Statesmen football team will represent Delta State University in the 2019 NCAA Division II football season. They will be led by seventh-year head coach Todd Cooley. The Statesmen will played their home games at McCool Stadium and are members of the Gulf South Conference.

Preseason

Gulf South Conference coaches poll
On August 1, 2019, the Gulf South Conference released their preseason coaches poll with the Statesmen predicted to finish in 6th place in the conference.

Preseason All-Gulf South Conference Team
The Statesmen had three players at three positions selected to the preseason all-Gulf South Conference team.

Offense

Innis Claud V – OG

Defense

Eric Sadler – DL

Special teams

Sam Barge – P

Schedule
Delta State 2019 football schedule consists of five home and away games in the regular season. The Statesmen will host GSC foes Florida Tech, Valdosta State, West Alabama and West Georgia, and will travel to Mississippi College, North Greenville, Shorter, and West Florida.

The Statesmen will host one of the two non-conference games against Tusculum from the South Atlantic Conference and will travel to Grand Valley State from the Great Lakes Intercollegiate Athletic Conference.

Two of the ten games will be broadcast on ESPN3 and ESPN+, as part of the Gulf South Conference Game of the Week.

Rankings

References

Delta State
Delta State Statesmen football seasons
Delta State Statesmen football